East Island is one of the Falkland Islands off Pebble Island and Broken Island in Byron Sound.

References

Islands of the Falkland Islands